Anthony Henley (1667–1711), of The Grange, Northington, Hampshire, was an English Whig politician who sat in the English and British House of Commons between 1698 and 1711. He was noted as a wit.

Early life
Henley was son of Sir Robert Henley of the Grange, near Alresford, Hampshire, Member of Parliament for Andover and his second wife Barbara Hungerford, daughter of Anthony Hungerford.  He matriculated at Christ Church, Oxford on 3 March 1682, aged 15 and was admitted at Middle Temple in 1684. At Oxford he studied classical literature, particularly poetry.  His grandfather was the legal official Sir Robert Henley, master of the court of king's bench, on the pleas side. Out of the profits of this post Anthony inherited a fortune of more than £3,000 a year.

Career
Coming to London, Henley was welcomed by the wits, and was on good terms with the Earl of Dorset and Earl of Sunderland. At the 1695 English general election he stood for Parliament at Newtown (Isle of Wight), but  was defeated. This seems to have stimulated his interest in politics and by 1697 he was going to meetings of the Whig Rose Club, and later the Kit-Cat. He was returned as Member of Parliament   for Andover at the 1698 English general election. He married in 1700, Mary Bertie, daughter of Peregrine Bertie and his wife  Susan Monins, daughter  of Sir Edward Monins of Waldershare, Kent. He  gained £30,000 by his marriage. He did not stand in either of the general elections of 1701, but was returned  as Whig MP for Weymouth and Melcombe Regis at the 1702 English general election. He was several times a teller for the Whigs. At the 1705 English general election he was returned again as Whig MP for Weymouth. He was returned for Weymouth again at the 1708 British general election  and supported the naturalization of the Palatines in 1709. On 14 December 1709 he moved the address to Queen Anne, urging some dignity in the church for Benjamin Hoadly, based on his justification of Revolution principles. He voted for the impeachment of Dr Sacheverell in 1710. He was returned again for Weymouth at the 1710 British general election and survived a petition against his return.

Wit and patron
Henley was one of the foremost Whig wits who welcomed Jonathan Swift's appearance in London life after the publication of the Tale of a Tub. He once said of Swift that he would be "a beast for ever, after the order of Melchisedeck", and Swift reported the witticism in the Journal to Stella. Letters from Henley in 1708–10 are in Swift's Works.

The Purcells had patronage from Henley, who was musical. The songs composed by Daniel Purcell for the opera of Brutus of Alba were dedicated on their publication in 1696 to Henley and Richard Norton, a friend; and his music for John Oldmixon's opera of The Grove, or Love's Paradise, was worked out on a visit to Henley and other friends in Hampshire. He himself wrote several pieces for music, and almost finished Daniel Purcell's opera of Alexander. Samuel Garth dedicated to him his poem The Dispensary, and he was a member of the Kit-Cat Club.

Death and legacy
Henley died of apoplexy in August 1711. He  left three sons, of whom the eldest, Anthony, MP for Southampton from 1727 to 1734, was a jester like his father. The younger sons were Robert Henley, 1st Earl of Northington, and Bertie, a churchman and prebendary of Bristol (died 1760). His widow afterwards married, as his second wife, her relative Henry Bertie.

Henley was a  half-brother  of John Henley and Robert Henley, both MPs. One of his sisters married Sir Theodore Janssen, the other was the wife of Sir John Rogers, 2nd Baronet. Henley found them both marriage portions in 1698. His marriage with Mary Bertie has been attributed to a need to clear himself from resulting debts.

The royal assent was given on 22 May 1712 to a bill arranging for the payment of the portions of Henley's younger children. From a letter written in 1733 it is apparent that Swift continued his friendship to the sons.

Works
John Nichols believed that Henley wrote for The Tatler. When the Whig Medley was started by Arthur Maynwaring as a counterblast to the Tory Examiner, one of the papers was written by Henley, and he is said to have aided William Harrison in his continuation of the Tatler. An anecdote told by him on the death of Charles II was in Gilbert Burnet's History of his own Time, and was criticised by Bevil Higgons in his volume of Remarks on Burnet. Alexander Pope said that Henley contributed the "Life of His Music-Master, Tom D'Urfey", a chapter in the Memoirs of Scriblerus. Henley liked describing the manners and foibles of servants, and possibly some of the pastiches of communications from them in The Spectator came from him.

Notes

 
Attribution

1667 births
1711 deaths
Members of the Parliament of Great Britain for English constituencies
English MPs 1698–1700
English MPs 1702–1705
English MPs 1705–1707
British MPs 1707–1708
British MPs 1708–1710
British MPs 1710–1713
People from Hampshire (before 1974)